Holmfrid Olsson (20 May 1943 – 27 January 2009) was a Swedish biathlete. He competed at the 1968 and 1972 Olympics and finished in third and fifth place in the 4×7.5 km relay, respectively. He placed 20–21st in the individual 20 km race. He won two more bronze medals in the 4×7.5 km relay at the 1966 and 1967 Biathlon World Championships.

References

1943 births
2009 deaths
Swedish male biathletes
Olympic biathletes of Sweden
Biathletes at the 1968 Winter Olympics
Biathletes at the 1972 Winter Olympics
Olympic bronze medalists for Sweden
Olympic medalists in biathlon
Biathlon World Championships medalists
Medalists at the 1968 Winter Olympics
People from Malung-Sälen Municipality
20th-century Swedish people